The Dordogne is a river in south-central and southwest France. The Dordogne and its watershed were designated Biosphere Reserve by UNESCO on July 11 2012.

Geography
It flows generally west about  through the Limousin and Périgord regions before flowing into the Gironde, its common estuary with the Garonne, at the Bec d'Ambès ("Ambès beak"), north of the city of Bordeaux.

Nature

The Dordogne is one of the few rivers in the world that exhibit the phenomenon of a tidal bore, known as a mascaret.

The upper valley of the Dordogne is a series of deep gorges. The cliffs, steep banks, fast flowing water and high bridges attract both walkers and drivers. In several places the river is dammed to form long, deep lakes. Camp sites and holiday homes have proliferated wherever the valley floor is wide enough to accommodate them.

Below Argentat and around Beaulieu-sur-Dordogne, the valley widens to accommodate fertile farmland, well-watered pasture and orchards. In the towns, which are major tourist attractions because of their history and architecture, the quaysides are lined with eating and drinking places. In Périgord, the valley widens further to encompass one of France's main gastronomic regions, with vineyards, poultry farms and truffle-rich woodlands.

The main season for tourism in the Valley of the Dordogne is from June to September, with July and August being high season. The lifestyle and culture of the Dordogne valley attract both visitors and incomers from all over France, but also from many other countries, particularly Britain and Germany.

Course

The départements of France through which the Dordogne runs, together with some towns in those départements that are on or quite near the river, are as follows:
The  of Puy-de-Dôme – The towns of Le Mont-Dore (near the source of the river) and La Bourboule;
The  of Corrèze – The towns of Argentat, Bort-les-Orgues, and Beaulieu-sur-Dordogne;
The  of Lot – The towns of Souillac, Pinsac, Lacave, Meyronne, Creysse, Montvalent, Martel, Floirac, Carennac, Gintrac, Tauriac and Prudhomat;
The  of Dordogne – The towns of Beynac-et-Cazenac, Sarlat, Saint-Cyprien, and Bergerac;
The  of Gironde – The towns of Sainte-Foy-la-Grande and Libourne.

Tributaries

Main tributaries from source to mouth:

(R) Chavanon;
(L) Rhue;
(R) Diège;
(L) Sumène;
(R) Triouzoune;
(L) Auze;
(R) Luzège;
(R) Doustre;
(L) Maronne;
(L) Cère;
(L) Bave;
(R) Sourdoire;
(L) Ouysse;
(L) Céou;
(R) Vézère;
(L) Couze;
(R) Caudeau;
(R) Lidoire;
(R) Isle.

N.B. : (R) = right tributary; (L) = left tributary

Activities
Aside from the usual activities such as tennis and golf available in many areas of France, there are a number of water-related activities related to the Dordogne, including:
Fishing, an age-old pastime for the locals and for visitors;
Canoeing and kayaking, very popular (canoes & kayaks are easy to rent);
Boating in a Gabare (a traditional skiff peculiar to the Dordogne);
Rafting;
Swimming;
Motorboating;
Sailing;
Rowing and sculling;
Water skiing.

Dams

Marèges Dam 
Dam at Bort-les-Orgues
Barrage de l'Aigle (The Eagle Dam)
Dam at Argentat
Dam at Bergerac
Dam at Chastang
Dam at Mauzac
Barrage de Tuilières

References

External links

The Dordogne Valley in the Lot department (website in French)
The Dordogne Valley UNESCO Biosphere Reserve (website in French)

Rivers of France
 
Rivers of Corrèze
Rivers of Dordogne
Rivers of Gironde
Rivers of Lot (department)
Rivers of Puy-de-Dôme
Rivers of Nouvelle-Aquitaine
Rivers of Auvergne-Rhône-Alpes
Rivers of Occitania (administrative region)
Biosphere reserves of France